Alexander Abraham Pihl (1 June 1920 – 20 November 2009) was a Norwegian physician and professor of medicine.

He was born in Kristiania, and completed his examen artium at Oslo Cathedral School in 1939. He was appointed professor at the University of Oslo from 1963 to 1990. His research areas included biochemistry, cancer therapy and radiation biology. He was decorated Knight of the Order of St. Olav in 1989. He was a fellow of the Norwegian Academy of Science and Letters from 1969.

References

1920 births
2009 deaths
Physicians from Oslo
People educated at Oslo Cathedral School
Norwegian oncologists
Norwegian biochemists
Norwegian radiologists
Academic staff of the University of Oslo
Members of the Norwegian Academy of Science and Letters